The British Academy Television Craft Awards of 2008 are presented by the British Academy of Film and Television Arts (BAFTA) and were held on 11 May 2008 at The Dorchester, Mayfair, the ceremony was hosted by Claudia Winkleman.

Winners and nominees
Winners will be listed first and highlighted in boldface.

Special awards
 David Croft
 Jimmy Perry

See also
 2008 British Academy Television Awards

References

External links
British Academy Craft Awards official website

2008 television awards
2008 in British television
2008 in London
May 2008 events in the United Kingdom
2008